David González may refer to:

David M. Gonzales (1923–1945), American soldier in World War II, Medal of Honor recipient
Dave Gonzalez (guitarist) (born 1961), member of The Paladins and the Hacienda Brothers
David Gonzales (cartoonist) (born 1964), Mexican-American cartoonist, creator of the "Homies"
David Gonzalez (handballer) (born 1974), Australian handball player
David González (footballer, born 1981), Spanish football player
David González (footballer, born 1982), Colombian football goalkeeper
David González (footballer, born 1986), Spanish-born Swiss football goalkeeper
David González (skateboarder) (born 1990), Colombian professional skateboarder
David González (footballer, born 1993), Spanish footballer
David González (cyclist) (born 1996), Spanish cyclist
David Gonzalez (journalist), American journalist
Maxi González (David Maximiliano González, born 2004), Argentine footballer